Lou Jiwei (born December 1950), is a Chinese politician, and current director of the 13th CPPCC Foreign Affairs Committee. 
Lou was Chairman of China's National Council for Social Security Fund, Minister for Finance, Chairman of China Investment Corporation and Central Huijin Investment, Vice Minister of Finance of China and Vice-Governor of Guizhou.

Biography
Lou Jiwei was born in December 1950, is from Yiwu, Zhejiang, and holds a master's degree in economics. He started working in February 1968, joined the Chinese Communist Party in January 1973, and graduated from the Institute of Quantitative and Technological Economics of the Chinese Academy of Social Sciences with a major in economic system analysis in December 1984. He is considered outspoken.

 February 1968 – February 1973: Soldier, South Sea Fleet, People's Liberation Army
 February 1973 – February 1978: Worker, Shougang Group then Beijing Research Institute of Automation for Machinery Industry
 February 1978 – February 1982: Student, B.S., Department of Computer Science and Technology, Tsinghua University
 February 1982 – February 1984: Student, M.S., Institute of Quantitative and Technological Economics, Chinese Academy of Social Sciences
 December 1984 – June 1986:  Principal Staff, Finance Group, Research Office, General Office of the State Council
 June 1986 – August 1988: Deputy Director, Finance Group, Research Office, General Office of the State Council
 March 1986 – September 1986: Co-Director of Finance and Taxation Group, State Council Economic System Reform Program Design Leading Group (seconded))
 August 1988 – September 1988: Director, Cost Price Group, Institute of Finance and Trade Economics, Chinese Academy of Social Sciences
 September 1988 – February 1989: Principal Staff, Office of Economic System Restructuring, Shanghai Municipal People's Government
 February 1989 – January 1992:  Deputy Director, Office of Economic System Restructuring, Shanghai Municipal People's Government
 January 1992 – September 1995: Director, Department of Macro-Control System, State Commission for Economic System Restructuring
 September 1995 – March 1998: Vice Governor and Member of Party Committee, Guizhou Provincial People's Government
 March 1998 – February 2007: Deputy Minister and Deputy Party Chief, Ministry of Finance of the People's Republic of China
 February 2007 – September 2007: Deputy Secretary-General, State Council of the People's Republic of China & Director of Preparatory Group, National Foreign Exchange Investment Corporation(China Investment Corporation)
 September 2007 – March 2013: Chair and Party Chief, China Investment Corporation and Central Huijin Investment
 March 2013 – November 2016:  Minister and Party Chief, Ministry of Finance of the People's Republic of China
 November 2016 – March 2019: Chair and Member of Party Committee, National Council for Social Security Fund
 March 2019 – Present: Director, 13th Foreign Affairs Committee of the CPPCC

Lou is a member of the 16th Central Commission for Discipline Inspection, alternate member of the 17th Central Committee of the Chinese Communist Party, member of the 18th Central Committee of the Chinese Communist Party, representative of the 19th National Congress of the Chinese Communist Party, and standing member of the 13th CPPCC National Committee.

Comments on 2021 economic data
On 11 December 2021, at a forum held by the China Centre for International Economic Exchanges in Beijing, Lou criticized the main economic indicators as insufficiently reflecting major economic problems, implying that recently released official warnings about economic pressures facing the country could not be explained by the indicators. In further support of his point, he mentioned his belief that among the 150 million economic entities registered as of 1 Novemberan increase by a half compared to a decade earlier, at least 40 million were not active.

Awards
In 2008, Time magazine considered Lou to be one of the 100 most influential people in the world. Forbes Magazine considered him to be the 30th most powerful person in the world, according to their "Powerful People 2010" list. In 2011 he was included in the 50 Most Influential ranking of Bloomberg Markets magazine. Lou was listed as twelfth on aiCIO's 2012 list of the 100 most influential institutional investors worldwide.

References

1950 births
Chinese Communist Party politicians from Zhejiang
Living people
Ministers of Finance of the People's Republic of China
People from Yiwu
People's Republic of China politicians from Zhejiang
Political office-holders in Guizhou
Politicians from Jinhua